Federal elections were held in Switzerland on 25 October 1863. The Radical Left remained the largest group in the National Council, but lost its majority for the first time since 1848.

Electoral system
The 128 members of the National Council were elected in 47 single- and multi-member constituencies; there was one seat for every 20,000 citizens, with seats allocated to cantons in proportion to their population. As a result of the 1860 census, the number of seats was increased by eight following the previous elections in 1860, although the number of constituencies was reduced from 49; the extra seats were given to Basel-Landschaft, Basel-Stadt, Geneva, Graubünden, St. Gallen, Thurgau, Vaud and Valais. The elections were held using a three-round system; candidates had to receive a majority in the first or second round to be elected; if it went to a third round, only a plurality was required. Voters could cast as many votes as there were seats in their constituency. In six cantons (Appenzell Innerrhoden, Appenzell Ausserrhoden, Glarus, Nidwalden, Obwalden and Uri), National Council members were elected by the Landsgemeinde.

Results

National Council 
Voter turnout was highest in the Canton of Schaffhausen (where voting was compulsory) at 88.2% and lowest in the Canton of Zürich at 18.6%.

By constituency

Council of States

References

1863
Switzerland
1863 in Switzerland
October 1863 events